John Simpson (2 September 1872 – 11 January 1921) was a Scotland international rugby union player. He later became an international referee and was the 31st President of the Scottish Rugby Union.

Rugby Union career

Amateur career

Simpson played with Royal HSFP.

Provincial career

Simpson played for Edinburgh District against Glasgow District in the 1894 inter-city match.

International career

Simpson was capped eleven times for Scotland between 1893 and 1899. He was part of the Scotland side that won the Triple Crown in 1894-95 season.

Referee career

He refereed one international match in the 1906 Home Nations Championship; the Ireland v Wales match.

Administrative career

He became the 31st President of the Scottish Rugby Union. He served one year from 1904 to 1905.

Medical career

Simpson became a doctor. He was a Fellow of the Royal College of Physicians of Edinburgh and a Fellow of the Royal College of Surgeons of Edinburgh.

Death

He died on 11 January 1921, leaving a widow Margaret Lockhart Mitchell. His estate was valued at £5204, 19 shillings and 3d. He is buried in Dean Cemetery in Edinburgh.

References

1872 births
1921 deaths
Scotland international rugby union players
Scottish rugby union players
Rugby union players from Falkirk (council area)
Presidents of the Scottish Rugby Union
Scottish rugby union referees
Royal HSFP players
Edinburgh District (rugby union) players